John Edward Buckley (March 20, 1870 – May 3, 1942), was a Major League Baseball pitcher who played with the Buffalo Bisons of the Players' League in .

Baseball career

Early professional career
Buckley was born in Marlborough, Massachusetts. He made his professional baseball debut in 1887, playing with the Wilkes-Barre Coal Barons of the Pennsylvania State Association. He pitched in two games, finishing with a 1–1 win–loss record and a 3.60 earned run average. In 1890, he played for Joliet in the Illinois–Iowa League.

Major Leagues (1890)
On July 15, 1890, Buckley made his major league debut for the Buffalo Bisons of the Players' League. In his debut, the Bisons defeated the Boston Reds 12–9. He pitched in four games for Buffalo, pitching in 34.0 innings, striking out four batters, and collecting one win and three losses. His earned run average was 7.68. At the plate, Buckley had 15 at bats, and went hitless. He pitched in his final game for Buffalo on July 25.

Return to the Minor leagues
Buckley would play for several minor league baseball teams from 1891 to 1901. In 1891, he pitched for both the Peoria Distillers of the Northwestern League and the Milwaukee Brewers of the Western League. In 1895, 1896, and 1901, he played for the Pawtucket Phenoms, Bangor Millionaires, Portland and Augusta of the New England League. He died on March 3, 1942, in Westborough, Massachusetts and is buried at Immaculate Conception Cemetery in Marlborough.

References

External links

Retrosheet

1869 births
1942 deaths
Major League Baseball pitchers
Baseball players from Massachusetts
Buffalo Bisons (PL) players
19th-century baseball players
Wilkes-Barre Coal Barons players
Joliet (minor league baseball) players
Peoria Distillers players
Milwaukee Brewers (minor league) players
Pawtucket Phenoms players
Bangor Millionaires players
Portland (minor league baseball) players
Augusta (minor league baseball) players